Mario Joaquim Azevedo (born 1940) is a Mozambican novelist, historian, professor, and epidemiologist.

A refugee, Azevedo, esteemed as one of the most remarkable Mozambican voices during the years of the War of Independence from Portugal, emigrated from his native country to the United States, where he received his B.A. from The Catholic University of America, his M.A., his Ph.D. from Duke University, from American University, and his M.P.H from the University of North Carolina at Chapel Hill.

In 1980 he became Associate Professor of History at Jackson State University; he passed in 1986 to the UNC Charlotte, where he has become Frank Porter Graham Professor and Chair of the Department of African-American and African Studies.

Azevedo was co-coordinator of the Southeastern Regional Seminar in Africa Studies from 1987 to 1989.

Works
The Returning Hunter, 1978
Africa and Its People: An Interdisciplinary Survey of the Continent (editor), 1982
Cameroon and Its National Character (editor), 1984
Cameroon and Chad in Historical and Contemporary Perspectives (editor), 1989
Historical Dictionary of Mozambique, 1991
Kenya: The Land, the People, and the Nation (editor), 1993
Africana Studies: A Survey of Africa and the African Diaspora (editor), 1993
Chad: A Nation in Search of Its Future (co-authored with Emmanuel U. Nnadozie), 1997
Roots of Violence: History of War in Chad, 1998
Tragedy and Triumph: Mozambique Refugees in Southern Africa, 1977-2001, 2002

References

Mozambican historians
Historians of Africa
Mozambican emigrants to the United States
Living people
Mozambican epidemiologists
Catholic University of America alumni
Duke University alumni
UNC Gillings School of Global Public Health alumni
Jackson State University faculty
University of North Carolina at Charlotte faculty
1940 births